Technological Forecasting and Social Change (formerly Technological Forecasting) is a peer-reviewed academic journal published by Elsevier which discusses futures studies, technology assessment, and technological forecasting. Articles focus on methodology and actual practice, and have been published since 1969.

The editors-in-chief are Scott Cunningham (University of Strathclyde) and Mei-Chih Hu (National Tsing Hua University). According to the Journal Citation Reports, the journal has a 2021 impact factor of 10.884.

See also
 Futures
 Foresight
Futures & Foresight Science
Journal of Futures Studies

References

External links

Futurology journals
Elsevier academic journals
English-language journals
Publications established in 1969
Science and technology studies journals